Prabin Chandra Sarma is an Indian politician. He was elected to the Lok Sabha, lower house of the Parliament of India from Gauhati, Assam in the 1996 Indian general election as a member of the Asom Gana Parishad.

References

External links
Official biographical sketch in Parliament of India website

Lok Sabha members from Assam
Asom Gana Parishad politicians
India MPs 1996–1997
Living people
1937 births